Gnorismoneura quadrativalvata is a moth of the family Tortricidae. It is found in China.

The wingspan is 13.5–14.5 mm for males and 16.5–18 mm for females. The ground color of the forewings is yellowish brown with dark brown patterns. The hindwings are dark grey.

Etymology
The specific name is from the Latin words quadratus (meaning quadrate or square) and valvatus (meaning valva) and refers to the shape of the valva.

References

Moths described in 2004
Archipini